This is a list of diplomatic missions of Belize, excluding honorary consulates. Belize is a Central American country bordering Mexico and Guatemala. It is also one of the more significant countries in the world which maintains an embassy in Taipei instead of Beijing.

America

 Havana (Embassy)

 Santo Domingo (Embassy)

 San Salvador (Embassy)

 Guatemala City (Embassy)

 Tegucigalpa (Embassy)

 Mexico City (Embassy)

 Washington, D.C. (Embassy)
 Los Angeles (Consulate-General)

Asia

 Taipei (Embassy)

Europe

 Brussels (Embassy)

 Rome (Embassy)

 Milan (Consulate-General)

 London (High Commission)

Multilateral organizations
 
Brussels (Mission)
 
New York (Permanent Mission)
 
Paris (Permanent Mission)
  United Nations Industrial Development Organization
Vienna (Permanent Mission)
 
Washington, D.C. (Permanent Mission)

Gallery

See also
 Foreign relations of Belize

Notes

References
Ministry of Foreign Affairs of Belize

Belize
Diplomatic missions